The Schimeck Family (German: Familie Schimek) is a 1957 Austrian comedy film directed by Georg Jacoby and starring Theo Lingen, Fita Benkhoff and Helga Neuner. The film's sets were designed by the art director Leo Metzenbauer. It is loosely based on the play of the same title by Gustaf Kadelburg, which had previously been adapted into a 1935 German film The Schimeck Family.

Cast
 Theo Lingen as Anton Kaltenbach
 Fita Benkhoff as Bernhardine, seine Frau
 Helga Neuner as Dora, ihre Tochter
 Adrienne Gessner as 	Tante Rosa
 Ernst Waldow as 	Josef Weigel
 Peer Schmidt as Dr. Kiesling, Advokat
 Oskar Sima as Johannes Zawadil
 Lucie Englisch as Frau Schimek
 Helga Martin as 	Hedwig Schimek, ihre Tochter
 Günther Fischer as Willy Schimek, ihr Sohn
 Rudi Priefer as Franzl Schimek, ihr Sohn
 Josef Meinrad as 	Baumann, Tischler
 Ernst Waldbrunn as Richter
 Cissy Kraner as 	Singer
 Ernst Meister as 	Edi, ein junger Mann aus 'besserem Haus'

References

Bibliography 
 Von Dassanowsky, Robert. Austrian Cinema. McFarland & Co, 2005.

External links 
 

1957 films
Austrian comedy films
1950s comedy films
1950s German-language films
Films directed by Georg Jacoby
Remakes of German films